Asău may refer to the following places in Romania:

Asău, a commune in Bacău County
Asău, a tributary of the Dămuc in Neamț County
Asău (Trotuș), a tributary of the Trotuș in Bacău County